Elena Marushiakova is a historian and ethnographer working in field of Romani Studies, of Slovak and Russian origin, who has lived and studied in Slovakia and Bulgaria. In 2016 she became a Research Professor in the School of History at the University of St Andrews. Elena Marushiakova became the president of the Gypsy Lore Society.

Life
Marushiakova started her professional career in the Ethnographic Institute at the Slovak Academy of Sciences, followed by work in the Institute of Ethnology and Folklore Studies and Ethnographic Museum at the Bulgarian Academy of Sciences.

From 2001 to 2004, Elena Marushiakova conducted research on Roma in the former Soviet Union in the framework of the Complex Research Programme “Difference and integration” of the Universities of Leipzig and Halle. From 2013 to 2014, she was Professor Fellow in International Research Centre Work and Human Lifecycle in Global History at the Humboldt University of Berlin, in 2015 Leverhulme Visiting Professor at the University of St Andrews, and in 2016 Professor Fellow in Imre Kertész Kolleg at Friedrich Schiller University Jena.

Since September 2016, Elena Marushiakova is the Principal Investigator of the ERC Advanced Grant and works as a Research Professor in the School of History at the University of St Andrews.

Elena Marushiakova was the president of the Gypsy Lore Society (2010-2020) and the Funding and Scientific Committee member of the European Academic Network on Romani Studies. From 2020 to 2022, she was co-editor in chief of the Romani Studies (journal).

Elena Marushakova is the founder and editor-in-chief of the Brill & Schoning Series "Roma History and Culture". 

Elena Marushiakova is a holder of the 2009 Fulbright New Century Scholars Award from the Bureau of Educational and Cultural Affairs of the U.S. Department of State and the Council for International Exchange of Scholars.

Professor Elena Marushiakova received on 7 February 2020 the Doctor Honoris Causa Award of Södertörn University in Stockholm for her great contribution to Romani Studies. The appointment was challenged by academics working with Romani studies at Södertörn who consider her work antiziganist and because of her contributions to the German school of "tsiganologie". This was disclosed by the Romani-Swedish magazine DIKKO in 2021. Numerous Roma and many scholars from different countries refuted the accusations and expressed their strong support for Elena Marushiakova.

In 2022, the Initiative Group for Roma Culture, which includes Roma intellectuals from Bulgaria, honoured Elena Marushiakova and Veselin Popov with the award "Romanipe" for their long-life activity in the field of Roma studies.

In 2022, the Best Historical Materials Committee of the Reference and User Services Association, an affiliate of the American Library Association selected as one of the Best Historical Materials published in 2020 and 2021 the book Marushiakova, Elena and Vesselin Popov, eds. 2021. Roma Voices in History: A Source Book. Roma Civic Emancipation in Central, South-Eastern and Eastern Europe from 19th Century until the Second World War. Leiden: Brill & Paderborn: Ferdinand Schöningh.

Main activities
Elena Marushiakova and her co-author Veselin Popov conducted numerous ethnographic field researches and have published about  Gypsies/Roma in Bulgaria, the Balkans, Central, Eastern and Southeastern Europe, South Caucasus and Central Asia. Their major works include the first book on Roma in Bulgaria (1997), a book on Gypsies in Ottoman Empire (2000), and a book on Gypsies in Central Asia and Caucasus (2016).

In frames of the RomaInterbellum project (ERC Advanced Grant 2016) led by Elena Marshiakova were published the volumes: “Roma Voices in History: A Source Book. Roma Civic Emancipation in Central, South-Eastern and Eastern Europe from the 19th Century until World War II” (2021), “Romani Literature and Press in Central, South-Eastern and Eastern Europe from the 19th Century until World War II” (2021), and “Roma Portraits in History: Roma Civic Emancipation Elite in Central, South-Eastern and Eastern Europe from the 19th Century until World War II” (2022). 

Elena Marushiakova and Veselin Popov also published in the fields of Roma folklore and oral history – the Studii Romani Series. They initiated the first museum exhibition about Roma in Bulgaria in 1995-1996 and the first international museum exhibition "Roma/Gypsies in Central and Eastern Europe" in 1998-1999 in Budapest.

Elena Marushiakova and Veselin Popov read lecture's courses and hold public lectures at universities and research institutes, and at summer schools in Bulgaria, Germany, United Kingdom, France, Belgium, Iceland, Finland, Poland, Lithuania, Czech Republic, Slovakia, Hungary, Serbia, Republic of Moldova, Turkey, Australia, New Zeland, Canada and the USA.

Bibliography

Books
Marushiakova, Elena and Vesselin Popov, eds. 2022. Roma Portraits in History. Roma Civic Emancipation Elite in Central, South-Eastern and Eastern Europe from the 19th Century until World War II. Leiden: Brill & Paderborn: Schöningh.  
Marushiakova, Elena and Vesselin Popov, eds. 2021. Roma Voices in History: A Source Book. Roma Civic Emancipation in Central, South-Eastern and Eastern Europe from 19th Century until the Second World War. Leiden: Brill & Paderborn: Schöningh. 
Marushiakova, Elena and Vesselin Popov. 2016. Gypsies of Central Asia and Caucasus. London: Palgrave Macmillan. 
Марушиакова, Елена и Веселин Попов. 2007. Студии Романи. Том VII. Избрано. София: Парадигма. 
Marushiakova, Elena, Udo Mischek, Vesselin Popov and Bernhard Streck. 2005. Dienstleistungsnomadismus am Schwarzen Meer. Zigeunergruppen zwischen Symbiose und Dissidenz. In Orientwissenschaftliche Hefte (16). 
Marushiakova, Elena and Vesselin Popov. 2001. Gypsies in the Ottoman Empire. Hatfield: University of Hertfordshire Press. [1st ed.: Марушиакова, Елена и Веселин Попов. 2000. Циганите в Османската империя. София: Литавра.] [Translations: Marushiakova, Elena and Vesselin Popov. 2003. Romi u Turskom Carstvu. Subotica: Čikoš Holding; Marushiakova, Elena and Vesselin Popov. 2006. Osmanlı Imperatorluğu’nda Çingeneler. Istanbul: Homer;یلینا ماروشیاکوف٢٠٠٩ ا و فاسلین بو. تاریخ الغج. الغجر فی الدولة العثما نیة. وکالةسفنکس (Egypt, 2009)]
Marushiakova, Elena and Vesselin Popov. 1997. Gypsies (Roma) in Bulgaria. Frankfurt am Main: Peter Lang. [1st ed.: Марушиакова, Елена и Веселин Попов. 1993. Циганите в България. София: Клуб ‘90.]

Collections of folklore and oral history
Marushiakova, Elena, Vesselin Popov and Birgit Igla, eds. 1998. Studii Romani. Vol. V-VI. The Snake's Ring. The Language and Folklore of Erli from Sofia. // Студии Романи. Том V-VI. Змийският пръстен. Език и фолклор на Софийските Ерлии. Sofia: Litavra. [bilingual edititon]
Marushiakova, Elena and Vesselin Popov, eds. 1997. Studii Romani. Vol. III-IV. The Song of the Bridge. // Студии Романи. Том III-IV. Песента за моста. Sofia: Litavra. [bilingual edititon]
Marushiakova, Elena and Vesselin Popov, eds. 1995. Studii Romani. Vol. II. // Студии Романи. Том II. Sofia: Club ’90. [bilingual edititon]
Marushiakova, Elena and Vesselin Popov, eds. 1994. Studii Romani. Vol. I. // Студии Романи. Том I. Sofia: Club ’90. [bilingual edititon]

University textbooks 
Марушиакова, Елена и Веселин Попов. 2012. Циганите в Източна Европа. Курс Лекции. София: Парадигма.
Кючуков, Христо, Елена Марушиакова и Веселин Попов. 2004. Христоматия по ромска култура. София: Иктус Принт.

Illustrated books and catalogues 
Marushiakova, Elena and Vesselin Popov. 2012. Roma Culture in Past and Present. Catalogue. Sofia: Paradigma. [Translations: Марушиакова, Елена и Веселин Попов. 2012. Ромската етнокултура – минало и настояще. Каталог. София: Парадигма; Marushiakova, Elena and Vesselin Popov. 2012. I Romani etnokultura – paluptnipe thaj akana. Katalogo. Sofia: Paradigma; Marushiakova, Elena and Vesselin Popov. 2012. La cultura étnica de los Gitanos (Roma) – pasado y presente. Catálogo. Sofia: Paradigma.]
Marushiakova, Elena, Udo Mischek, Vesselin Popov and Bernhard Streck. 2008. Zigeuner am Schwarzen Meer. Leipzig: Eudora Verlag.
Marushiakova, Elena and Vesselin Popov. 2000. Gypsies Roma in Times Past and Present. Photo-Book. // Цигани/Рома от старо и ново време. Фото-книга. Sofia: Litavra. [bilingual edititon]
Marushiakova, Elena and Vesselin Popov. 1995. The Gypsies of Bulgaria. Problems of the multicultural museum exhibition. // Циганите на България. Проблеми на мултикултуралната музейна експозиция. Sofia: Club ’90. [bilingual edititon]

Assessment studies
Guy, Will, Andre Liebich and Elena Marushiakova. 2010. Improving the tools for the social inclusion and non-discrimination of Roma in the EU. Report. Luxembourg: Publications Office of the European Union.
Marushiakova, Elena et al. 2001. Identity Formation among Minorities in the Balkans: The Cases of Roms, Egyptians and Ashkali in Kosovo. Sofia: Minority Studies Society “Studii Romani”.

Edited volumes
Marushiakova, Elena and Vesselin Popov, eds. 2020. Gypsy Policy and Roma Activism: From the Interwar Period to Current Policies and Challenges. Social Inclusion. Vol. 8, No. 2.  
Kyuchukov, Hristo, Elena Marushiakova and Vesselin Popov, eds. 2020. Preserving the Romani Memories. Festschrift in Honor of Dr. Adam Bartosz. München: Lincom Academic Publishers.
Kyuchukov, Hristo, Elena Marushiakova and Vesselin Popov, eds. 2016. Roma: Past, Present, Future. München: Lincom Academic Publishers.
Marushiakova, Elena and Vesselin Popov, eds. 2016. Roma Culture: Myths and Realities. München: Lincom Academic Publishers.
Kyuchukov, Hristo, Elena Marushiakova and Vesselin Popov, eds. 2016. Roma: Past, Present, Future. München: Lincom Academic Publishers.
Marushiakova, Elena, ed. 2008. Dynamics of National Identity and Transnational Identities in the Process of European Integration. Newcastle: Cambridge Scholars Publishing.

References

External links
 CV 
 Academia.edu 
 Specialized library with archive 'Studii Romani' 

Living people
Bulgarian people of Slovak descent
Bulgarian people of Russian descent
Year of birth missing (living people)
Romani studies